The Holm House (Danish: Holms Gård) is a listed property located at Gammeltorv 14 in the Old Town of Copenhagen, Denmark. The building was listed on the Danish registry of protected buildings and places in 1926.

History

Early history

The property was in the late 17th century part of a æarger property. In Copenhagen's first property of 1789, it was listed as No. 5. It was by then owned by councilman Hans Knudsen Leegaard.

After the Copenhagen Fire of 1728, the property was acquired by Abraham Pelt. He subsequently moved his sugar refinery from Christianshavn to his new property on Gammeltorv. In the new cadastre of 1756, the property was again listed as No. 5. It was by then still owned by Pelt.

Hinrich Ladiges and his sugar refinery
The property was acquired by Hinrich Ladiges in circa 1757. He had until then been the owner of a sugar refinery in Viborg.  He continued the sugar refinery in the new location. As of the 1787 census, he resided in the building with on his property with an office clerk, 14 sugar refineryworkers, a coachman, a housekeeper and two maids. a male servant.

Ladiges' property was together with most of the other buildings in the area in the Copenhagen Fire of 1795. The current buildings on the site was built for Ladiges in 1798. At the time of the 1801 cemsis, Æadiges was residing in the building with the office clerk Niels Møller, a housekeeper, a maid, a female cook, a coachman and a caretaker.

Ladiges died as one of the wealthiest men in the country in 1805 In the new cadastre of 1806, the property was listed as No. 4.

Later history
 
Another successful merchant, Lauritz Nicolai Hvidt, lived in the building from 1808 to 1809. He would later become one of the largest shipowners in the country and manager of Bank of Denmark from 1835 and until his death.

At the time of the 1840 census, No. 4 was home to four households. Simon Aron Eiberchutz, a Jewish businessman, resided on the first floor with his Rose Eiberchutz (née Vallich), the 60-year-old widow 	Judutte Vallich, the 17-year-old girl Frederikke Abrahamsen, a housekeeper, a maid and a male servant. Jens Claus Hansen, a member of the University of Copenhagen's government body (Konsistorium), resided on the second floor with his four children (aged six to 15), a housekeeper, pne male servant and one maid. Hans Nicolai Zøylner, a 37-year-old tea and porcelain merchant, resided in the basement with one servant. Ane Chatrine Backer, a 64-year old widow and the building's concierge, was also resident in the basement with her 23-year-old daughter.

A later owner was Christian Holm after whom it has received the name under which it is now known. He was a son of the industrialist and shipowner Jacob Holm.

The linguist Vilhelm Thomsen was born in the building on 25 January 1842. He was a professor of comparative linguistics at the University of Copenhagen from 1887 to 1913 and was awarded the Order of the Elephant in 1812 as one of few non-roral recipients in modern times.

Architecture
The building facing the square stands in undressed, red brick with sandstone detailing. It is five bays wide and consists of three floors over a high cellar. The gateway opens to a courtyard surrounded by three perpendicular buildings and a rear wing.

Commemorative plaques
A plaque on the facade of the building Commemorates thatVilhelm Thomsen] was born in the building. It was installed on his 101-year birthsday on 25 January 1943. Inside the gateway is a Commemorative plaque that lists all the names of owners of the site since the 15th century.

Today
The Drunken Flamingo, a cocktail bar, is based in the ground floor.
Holm & Bertung, a PR agency founded in 1996, is based on the second floor.

References

External links

 Source

Houses in Copenhagen
Sugar refineries in Copenhagen
Listed residential buildings in Copenhagen
Neoclassical architecture in Copenhagen
Houses completed in 1809
Commemorative plaques in Copenhagen